89.0 RTL is a German radio channel whose studios are located in Halle (Saale). It aims at the 14-29 age bracket.

It aired first on 24 August 2003 and replaced the radio channel Project 89.0 Digital. While it is licensed to Saxony-Anhalt, the exposed position of the Brocken at 3,743 ft allows the channel to cover large parts of central Germany, including Lower Saxony, Thuringia, Brandenburg and Saxony. The channel can be received on FM 89.0 and on DAB channel 12C.

References

External links

Radio stations in Germany
RTL Group
Mass media in Halle (Saale)
Contemporary hit radio stations
Radio stations established in 2003